The ICC EAP Cricket Trophy (One day) is the Limited overs cricket tournament of the ICC EAP Cricket Trophy in the ICC East Asia-Pacific region.

Tournament History

2005

The first tournament that took place was the 2005 ICC EAP Cricket Cup. This was won by Japan, who defeated Cook Islands in the final. Both finalists gained a place in the next qualifying tournament, the 2006 ICC EAP Cricket Trophy.

2006

The second competition, the 2006 ICC EAP Cricket Trophy saw the winners of the previous trophy play against Fiji to determine which team would qualify for 2007 ICC World Cricket League Division Three. The champion was Fiji who won the competition easily.

2007

The 2007 ICC EAP Cricket Trophy provided the opportunity for two teams from the East Asia-Pacific Region to qualify for the 2008 WCL Division Five. Japan won the tournament and progressed along with Vanuatu who finished second.

2009

The 2009 EAP Trophy was held in Apia, Samoa from 17 to 25 September. The tournament was split into two parts, the first a Twenty20 competition and the second in the 50-over format. It was also the first time that Papua New Guinea participated in the competition. This part of the tournament was played from 19 to 25 September. In another new feature of the 2009 competition, the teams were split into two divisions based on whether they currently participated in the World Cricket League structure. This was mainly so that the Division Two would act as a qualifier for 2010 WCL Division Eight. Papua New Guinea won Division One while Vanuatu were the champions of Division Two and consequently qualified for the WCL.

Division One

Division Two

2011

Tournament results

See also
 ICC EAP Cricket Trophy (Twenty20)
 Cricket World Cup

References

East Asia-Pacific

Oceanian championships
Recurring sporting events established in 2005